Jumeira Baccalaureate School (JBS) is a Pre KG to Grade 12 school in Jumeirah District, Dubai City, the United Arab Emirates. It is a private institution managed by Taaleem, a UAE-based company and one of the largest education providers in the Middle East.

Curriculum
The school is an International Baccalaureate (IB) World School, providing education from Pre-KG to Grade 12. The Pre-K and KG 1 curriculum is built around the British Early Years Foundation Stage (EYFS) curriculum, while KG2 to Grade 5 curriculum is organized around the Literacy and Numeracy programmes for England and Wales and the International Primary Curriculum (IPC). These are followed by the IB's Middle Years Programme (MYP), Diploma Programme (DP), IB's Careers-related Programme (IBCP) and the Business and Technology Education Council (BTEC) National Diploma.

Campus and facilities
The school spreads over 8 acres of landscaped grounds. JBS has a large multi-purpose auditorium/elementary gym, senior indoor sports hall, computer information and communication, technologies laboratories, well-equipped design and technology rooms, science laboratories, indoor playroom, 25m shaded swimming pool, two rooftop tennis courts, extensive grass sports pitches, sports field with changing facilities,  two-storey library/learning resources and media centre, indoor and outdoor shaded learning spaces and playgrounds.

Languages
The school language of Instruction is English. Arabic and French are offered from KG onwards.

Activities
Students at JBS are able to participate in a broad range of activities offered including Yoga, Rock Choir, Cricket, Arabic Reading, Arabic Dance, Swim Squad, Football, Drama Club, Chess, Dance Club, Quran Club, Cooking, Spanish Club, Manga club, Kickboxing, Badminton, Netball, Tennis, Arabic Drama Club, DIY (students create and design different items- clothing, household, items, school stationery, etc.), debate club, Table tennis, Rock / Reggae Band, Designing and creating Arabic Blogs, Rugby, Arabic Calligraphy Club, Painting club, MUN (Modern United Nation), creative writing, Dodgeball, LEGO, school Newspaper, Basketball, and Guitar Club.

KHDA inspection reports
The Knowledge and Human Resources Authority (KHDA) is an educational quality assurance authority in Dubai, United Arab Emirates. They are responsible for the growth, direction, and quality of private education and learning in Dubai. They have consistently rated the school as "very good."

References

International schools in Dubai
Buildings and structures in Dubai
International schools in the United Arab Emirates
International Baccalaureate schools in the United Arab Emirates
Private schools in the United Arab Emirates
Jumeirah, Dubai